Aleksandr Sergeyevich Demyanenko (May 30, 1937 – August 22, 1999) was a Soviet and Russian actor. People's Artist of the RSFSR (1991). He is best known for playing the character Shurik in Leonid Gaidai's movies.

Life and career

Early life
Aleksandr Demyanenko was born in Sverdlovsk, Soviet Union in 1937. Aleksandr's mother, Galina Belkova was an accountant. His father, Sergei Petrovich, was an actor who graduated from the Lunacharsky State Institute for Theatre Arts. Sergei later worked as a director at the Sverdlovsk Opera Theatre, and as a child Aleksandr played bit parts at the theatre. Aleksandr attended a theater workshop at the Palace of Culture and parallel to that he studied piano at a music school. He also learned foreign languages with an emphasis on German in middle school and in high school started to sing in a baritone. In 1954 he began to study jurisprudence at the Sverdlovsk University of Law, but was expelled from the first semester for skipping lessons. In 1954 he failed to get into the Moscow Art Theatre, however in 1955 he was accepted both at the Lunacharsky State Institute for Theatre Arts and at the Boris Shchukin Theatre Institute in Moscow. He ended up choosing Lunacharsky.

Acting career
In 1959 he was cast in the film The Wind. The same year he graduated from the Lunacharsky State Institute for Theatre Arts theatre acting school. He then worked in the Mayakovsky Theatre in Moscow. In 1959 he starred in Everything Begins with Hitting the Road.

In 1961 Aleksandr Demyanenko moved to Leningrad and became staff actor at Lenfilm studio. There he starred in the film Grown-Up Children. He then went on to play in A Night Before Christmas, Peace to Him Who Enter and was cast for the title role in Dima Gorin's Career. In 1962 he starred in A Trip Without a Load and Bang the Drum. In 1963 he starred in Cheka Employee, The First Trolleybus and Cain XVIII. In 1964 he starred in The Returned Music and State Offender.

In 1965 he was cast for the role of Shurik in the classic Soviet comedy Operation Y and Shurik's Other Adventures. This role earned Demyanenko the image of nerdy student Shurik ("Shurik" being a diminutive form of the name Aleksandr). In 1966 he starred in the semi-sequel to the film Kidnapping, Caucasian Style. In 1967, he starred in the film War Under the Roofs and in 1968 in The Dead Season. In 1969 he starred in Tomorrow, April 3 and The Ugryum River. In 1971 he starred in Dauria. In 1972 he starred in Hello and Goodbye and The Singing Teacher.

In 1973 he once again reunited with Leonid Gaidai to star in the film Ivan Vasilievich: Back to the Future where he played a scientist named Shurik who invents a time machine. Demyanenko was unable to gain popularity for other roles as he was typecast as a scientist due to his tremendous popularity as the nerdy, crime-fighting student Shurik. He frequently provided voice-overs for foreign and domestic films, and even Donatas Banionis admitted that his dubbing was an improvement over his original acting.

Later years
He appeared in the television movie Old Songs of the Main Things 2 in 1997 playing an aged Shurik. He had a brief role in the TV series Strawberry and reprised his famous role of the nerdy professor in Old Songs of the Main Things 3 in 1998.

He was diagnosed with congestive heart failure but was afraid of getting bypass surgery. In 1999 Aleksandr Demyanenko died from a heart attack. Some analysts say this played a part in the success of the Communist Party of the Russian Federation in the December 1999 elections as the lack of a social welfare system was frequently blamed for his death.

Personal life
His first marriage was to Marina Sklyarova with whom he went to acting classes. He divorced Sklyarova when he became involved with voice-over director from Lenfilm Liudmila Demyanenko. She became his second wife and they remained married until his death. He became the stepfather to her daughter Angelica Nevolina, who later became an actress.

Filmography
The Wind (1959) as Mitya
Five Days, Five Nights (1960) as soldier
Adult Children (1961) as Igor Nikolayevich Vinogradov
Dima Gorin's Career (1961) as Dima Gorin
Peace to Him Who Enters (1961) as Alexander Ivlev 
A Trip Without a Load (1962) as Pavel Sirotkin
Cain XVIII (1963) as Ian
State Criminal (1964) as Andrei Nikolayevich Polikanov 
Operation Y and Shurik's Other Adventures (1965) as Shurik
Kidnapping, Caucasian Style (1967) as Shurik
My good Dad (1970) as Dad
 Find me, Lyonya! (1971)
Dauria (1971) as executioner
Failure of Engineer Garin (1973) as episode (uncredited)
Ivan Vasilievich: Back to the Future (1973) as Shurik
 Strange Adults (1974) as Nalivaiko  
 The Last Winter Day (1974)
 Unique (1975) as scientist
 Eleven Hopes (1975) as Volodya
 Crane in the Sky (1977) as Andrei Zabolotny
 A Moment Decides Everything (1978) as Nikolai Ivanovich Martynov
 Chest of Drawers Was Lead Through the Street... (1978) as Misha
 The Nightingale (1979) as Mekhanikus
 Die Fledermaus (1979) as lawyer Blindt
 The Useless Girl (1980) as Viktor Tikhonov
 Comrade Innokenty (1981)
 It Was Beyond the Narva Gate (1981)
 An Awful Day (1982)
 My Love: A Revolution (1982)
 The Green Van (1983) as Viktor Prokofievich Shestakov
 Echo of a Distant Blast (1983) as Albert Valdaitsev
 Stories of an Old Magician (1984) as cannibal
 Dear, Dearest, Beloved, Unique... (1984) as police captain
 A Prophetic Dream, or Suitcase (1985) as uncle of Pavel
 Bright Personality (1988) as doctor Spravchenko
 Tamara Aleksandrovna's Husband and Daughter (1988) as uncle Slava
 A Game for Millions (1991) as Roman Zhukov
 And to Hell with Us (1991) as Andrei Andreevich
 The White Clothes (1991) as Parai
 Seven-Forty (1992) as Viktor Pavlovich

Voice-over (imported films) 

 The Importance of Being Ernest (1952) (Michael Denison)
 The Great Race (1965) (Tony Curtis)
 The Lion in Winter (1968) (John Castle)
 Mayerling (1968) (Omar Sharif)
Murd am Montag (1968) (Horst Schulze)
 Hangar 18 (1980) (Robert Vaughn)
 Under Siege (1992) (Nick Mancuso)
 Falling Down (1993) (Robert Duvall)
 Showgirls (1995) (Al Ruscio)
 Con Air (1997) (Steve Buscemi)
 Nothing to Lose (1997) (Michael McKean)
 Enemy of the State (1998) (Jon Voight)
 Armageddon (1998) (Steve Buscemi)
 My Favorite Martian (1999) (Michael Lerner)

References

External links

1937 births
1999 deaths
20th-century Russian male actors
Actors from Yekaterinburg
Honored Artists of the RSFSR
People's Artists of the RSFSR
Russian male film actors
Russian male stage actors
Russian male television actors
Russian male voice actors
Soviet male film actors
Soviet male stage actors
Soviet male television actors
Soviet male voice actors
Burials at Serafimovskoe Cemetery